Yente (18th-century) was a Jewish spritiual Hasidic leader. She wore the tallit. 

She was a disciple of Baal Shem Tov, who declared her to be a prophet. She became a figure of pilgrimage, to whom both men and women came and gave gifts in exchange for gifts and blessings.

References

 The JPS Guide to Jewish Women: 600 B.C.E.to 1900 C.E.

Year of birth unknown
Year of death unknown
18th-century Polish Jews
18th-century Polish women
18th-century religious leaders
Jewish mysticism